Isaac Annan (born 9 September 2001) is a Ghanaian footballer who plays as a defender for Kristiansund.

Career
In March 2022, he signed a three-year contract with Norwegian side Kristiansund. On 10 April 2022, he made his Eliteserien debut in a 3–2 loss against Sarpsborg 08.

References

External links

2001 births
Living people
Ghanaian footballers
Kristiansund BK players
Eliteserien players
Association football defenders
Ghanaian expatriate footballers
Expatriate footballers in Norway
Ghanaian expatriate sportspeople in Norway